Feng Xiaoting (born 22 October 1985) is a Chinese professional footballer who currently plays for Chinese Super League club Shanghai Shenhua.

Club career
Feng Xiaoting started his football career with Sichuan Guancheng in the 2003 league season where he quickly established himself as a regular. Despite being only 17 years old, he captained them for several games, making him the youngest club captain in professional Chinese football. In December 2003, Feng had a brief trial with Ligue 1 side FC Nantes but failed to join the club. His second season was considerably less productive after he suffered a serious injury and subsequently missed most of the 2004 league season.

As a promising youngster with top tier experience, Feng quickly drew the attentions of top tier side Dalian Shide and transferred to them in the 2005 league season even though he was still injured and missed much of the early stages of the season. Nevertheless, during the latter half of the season, he started to play a vital part in Dalian's push for the league and cup double, where he saw them win both. The following seasons though saw Feng play a smaller role within the club and it was only once then manager Ji Mingyi left before he started to establish himself as an integral member of the squad during the 2008 season.

Feng came close to signing with Serie A side A.C. Siena during the summer of 2008. Their sporting director Manuel Gerolin watched all of Chinese under-23 national team's matches during the 2008 Summer Olympics matches and was impressed by Feng, but problems with the player's registration delayed this possibility. With his contract about to end with Dalian, Feng received offers from K-League sides Chunnam Dragons, Jeju United and Daegu FC before the 2009 season. He eventually signed a two-year contract with Daegu FC on a free transfer. Feng made his debut for the club on 22 March 2009 in a 2–2 draw against Pohang Steelers. On 29 January 2010, Feng signed for K-League champions Jeonbuk Hyundai Motors on a free transfer. Feng did not have a starting role in the backline for Jeonbuk that season and was soon released by the club.

Feng decided to sign for Chinese Super League side Guangzhou Evergrande right before the start of the 2011 season. That year, with a tight defense only conceding 23 goals the entire season, saw Guangzhou win their first ever top tier title. In the 2012 season, Feng helped the club to a domestic double, winning both the top tier title and the Chinese FA Cup.

International career
Feng was first called up to the Chinese national team by then manager Arie Haan who gave him his debut in a 2–0 win against Myanmar on 17 March 2004. The following manager Zhu Guanghu decided that Feng was too inexperienced for the senior team and Feng was instead part of the Chinese under-23 national team that played in the 2008 Summer Olympics where he was the first-choice centre back and was paired with Li Weifeng as China were knocked out in the group stage. After the tournament, Feng was promoted back to the national team once again when then manager Vladimir Petrović included him during 2010 FIFA World Cup qualification. He soon became a regular for the national team and went on to win the 2010 East Asian Football Championship. On 20 November 2018, Feng scored his first international goal in a 1–1 draw against Palestine.

Personal life
Feng married Zhao Yingying, who works for China's national television network CCTV, on 16 February 2009.

Career statistics

Club statistics
.

International statistics

International goals
 
Scores and results list China's goal tally first.

Honours

Club
Dalian Shide
Chinese Super League: 2005
Chinese FA Cup: 2005

Guangzhou Evergrande
Chinese Super League: 2011, 2012, 2013, 2014, 2015, 2016, 2017, 2019
AFC Champions League: 2013, 2015
Chinese FA Cup: 2012, 2016
Chinese FA Super Cup: 2012, 2016, 2017, 2018

International
China PR national football team
East Asian Football Championship: 2005, 2010

Individual
Chinese Super League Team of the Year: 2015, 2016, 2017, 2018
Chinese Footballer of the Year: 2017

References

External links
 
 Chinese Player Record
 
 
 
 
 
 
 

1985 births
Living people
Chinese footballers
Footballers from Dalian
China international footballers
Olympic footballers of China
Sichuan Guancheng players
Dalian Shide F.C. players
Daegu FC players
Jeonbuk Hyundai Motors players
Guangzhou F.C. players
Shanghai Shenhua F.C. players
Chinese Super League players
K League 1 players
Chinese expatriate footballers
Chinese expatriate sportspeople in South Korea
Expatriate footballers in South Korea
Association football defenders
Footballers at the 2006 Asian Games
Footballers at the 2008 Summer Olympics
2019 AFC Asian Cup players
Asian Games competitors for China